Sultan Al-Brake (Arabic:سلطان البريكي) (born 7 April 1996) is a Qatari footballer. He currently plays for Al-Duhail.

Career
Al-Brake was loaned out to ASPIRE-owned Spanish club Cultural Leonesa in November 2015.

External links

References

Qatari footballers
Qatari expatriate footballers
1996 births
Living people
Al-Wakrah SC players
Al-Duhail SC players
Cultural Leonesa footballers
Aspire Academy (Qatar) players
Qatar Stars League players
Association football defenders
Qatari expatriate sportspeople in Spain
Qatar youth international footballers